The short-tailed mongoose (Urva brachyura) is a mongoose species native to Peninsular Malaysia, Sumatra and Borneo. It is listed as Near Threatened on the IUCN Red List since 2008.

It was first described by John Edward Gray in 1837.

It is red-brown to black and has black limbs. The head is grayish with a black spot on the chin. Its total body length is  including a  short tail.

Subspecies
 U. b. brachyura
 U. b. hosei 
 U. b. javanensis
 U. b. palawanus
 U. b. parvus
 U. b. sumatrius

References 

Urva (genus)
Carnivorans of Malaysia
Fauna of Sumatra
Mammals of Borneo
Mammals of Brunei
Mammals of Indonesia
Mammals described in 1837
Taxa named by John Edward Gray
Taxobox binomials not recognized by IUCN